Zhidan is a county under the administration of the prefecture-level city of Yan'an, in the northwest of Shaanxi Province, China, bordering Gansu Province to the south. Zhidan County and surrounding areas host oil drilling and industry.

Administrative divisions
Zhidan County is divided into 1 subdistrict and 7 towns.

Bao'an Subdistrict 
The county's sole subdistrict is Bao'an Subdistrict, which hosts the county's government.

Towns 
Zhidan County is home to the following 7 towns:

 
 
 Yongning

Geography 

Climate 

History
The area now known as Zhidan County was formerly known as the town of Bao'an (Postal Romanization: Paoan) (corresponding to the urban core of today's Zhidan County). The town of Bao'an appears in many contemporaneous works and articles discussing the Chinese Civil War. The historical significance of the town of Bao'an arises due to its having temporarily served as the capital of the Communist-held regions of China in the midst of the Chinese Civil War. From early July 1936 to January 1937 Bao'an was the site of the Communist Party of China's (CPC) Central Committee headquarters, as well as that of the Chinese Communist military forces.

Journalist Edgar Snow visited the communist leaders in Bao'an in the summer and fall of 1936, and named the third part of his book Red Star Over China after this town. He described the town as follows:
Pao An was once a frontier stronghold... Remains of its fortifications, flame-struck in that afternoon sun, could be seen flanking the narrow pass through which once emptied into this valley the conquering legions of the Mongols. There was an inner city, still, where the garrisons were once quartered; and a high defensive masonry, lately improved by the Reds, embraced about a square mile in which the present town was located.

In 1937, Yan'an (Wade-Giles: Yenan) replaced Bao'an as the capital of Communist-held China.

The modern name of the county, Zhidan, takes its name from Liu Zhidan, military strategist and high-ranking leader of the Chinese Workers' and Peasants' Red Army who died while leading the Eastern Expedition in April 1936.

Economy 
Zhidan County has a number of mineral deposits, such as petroleum, coal, natural gas, dolomite, oil shale, and mineral water.

References

External links
http://www.marxists.org/reference/archive/mao/selected-works/volume-4/mswv4_01.htm
http://english.chinamil.com.cn/special/Stratagicist/content_eng_for_gong.htm
https://web.archive.org/web/20090529041926/http://uk.encarta.msn.com/encyclopedia_761580341/Chinese_Revolution.html

 
County-level divisions of Shaanxi